Daubeuf-Serville is a commune in the Seine-Maritime department in the Normandy region of northern France.

Geography

Population

Places of interest
 The church of Notre-Dame, dating from the eleventh century.
 The church of St.Laurent, dating from the sixteenth century.
 Two 17th century chateaux.

See also
Communes of the Seine-Maritime department

References

Communes of Seine-Maritime